Xandar is a fictional planet appearing in American comic books published by Marvel Comics. The planet is depicted as being in the Tranta system in the Andromeda Galaxy. It is best known as the home world of the Nova Corps, an intergalactic police task force. Xandar is also the home planet of Firelord and Air-Walker, former Heralds of Galactus, as well as the super-villain and anti-hero Supernova.

The first appearance of Xandar was made in Nova #1 (1976) by writer Marv Wolfman and artist John Buscema. The 2014 film Guardians of the Galaxy introduced it to the Marvel Cinematic Universe as an alien planet where the major plot took place.

History
Blown apart in an attack by the Luphomoid Zorr, Xandar is saved from complete destruction by the timely intervention of Uatu the Watcher, who assists the Xandarians in creating a network of interconnected domed cities out of the largest remaining pieces of the planet.

The planet is later nearly destroyed by the Skrulls. Later still, Nebula destroyed the planet and the Nova Corps. The Nova Corps were resurrected by Richard Rider who used the Nova Force power to reboot the Xandarian Worldmind computer which proceeded to clone the dead Xandarians including Queen Adora.

The war-torn planet is, once again, completely destroyed, and the Nova Corps decimated at the hands of Annihilus. Rider stands as the last surviving Nova Corps member following the massacre. The collective hive mind which resided in Xandar's core, an entity known as the Xandarian Worldmind, also survived and is now housed within Rider's newly modified uniform, which has also been enhanced to assist him in containing the full measure of the Nova Force.

For a short time, Ego the Living Planet became a temporary home for the corps, known as "New Xandar." This was short lived as it was revealed Ego's intelligence was gradually returning and was attempting to corrupt the newly re-formed Nova Corps.

Xandarians
The Xandarians are a peaceful human-like race.

Royalty
Suzerain Adora was their Queen. Her husband Tanak Valt was Nova Prime. Adora once enlisted the Fantastic Four's help to end the war with the Skrulls.

Nova Corps

The Nova Corps was originally a space militia and exploration group for the planet Xandar. It consisted of 500 soldiers ranging in rank from Corpsman up to Centurion and its leader Centurion Nova Prime. The source of the Corps' power is a nearly limitless energy field called the Nova Force, generated by the Xandarian Worldmind. There are many notable individuals who used to be members of the Corps, including Peter Quill, Rocket Raccoon, and Samuel Alexander.

Xandarian Worldmind
The Xandarian Worldmind is a supercomputer located in the bowels of Xandar, made up of the collective intelligence of the deceased Nova Corps members and the Xandar people. Actual brains are stored within the computer. Its purpose is to preserve the knowledge and history of Xandar and to serve as the custodian of the Nova Force.

Known Xandarians
 Suzerain Adora
 Tanak Valt (Nova-Prime)
 Thoran Rul (Protector)
 Rhomann Dey (Nova, entrusted his powers to Richard Rider)
 Rieg Davan (Powerhouse)
 Garthan Saal (Supernova)
 Pyreus Kril (Firelord)
 Gabriel Lan (Air-Walker)
 Master Xar (Co-Creator of H.E.R.B.I.E.)

Other versions
Planet Xandar appeared as a flashback in the comic mini-series Avengers: Infinity War Prelude (2018).

In other media

Television
Xandar appears in the Guardians of the Galaxy animated series.

Film
Xandar appears in live-action films set in the Marvel Cinematic Universe as the capital planet of the Nova Empire and home of the Xandarians' military wing, the Nova Corps.
 Xandar first appeared in Guardians of the Galaxy. The Xandarians had signed a peace treaty with the Kree Empire, ending a war between the two sides. However, Kree fanatic Ronan the Accuser used an Infinity Stone to attack Xandar in retaliation for the death of his father and forefathers. However, the Guardians of the Galaxy and the Ravagers helped the Nova Corps defeat Ronan and entrusted the Infinity Stone to the Xandarians.
 The primary Xandarians are depicted with pink skin, though other alien species live in the planet's cities. The setting of Xandar was inspired by the monumental steel, glass, and white concrete Liège-Guillemins railway station in Liège, Belgium. During the filming process, London's Millennium Bridge was used to double as a location on Xandar.
 The planet Xandar was said to have been "decimated" by Thanos prior to the events of Avengers: Infinity War, as he sought the Infinity Stone in the Nova Corps' possession.

Video games
Xandar appears in Lego Marvel Super Heroes 2. The planet serves as the first level, wherein the Guardians of the Galaxy attempt to fight off Kang the Conqueror's forces. When Eson the Searcher was defeated, Kang stole a part of Xandar to incorporate into Chronopolis.

References

Fiction set in the Andromeda Galaxy
Marvel Comics planets